Our Lady of Lourdes Hospital is a 197 bed community hospital in Binghamton, New York, United States.

In 1983, the hospital was selected by the US Federal Government to take part in a national cancer research project.  In 2006, a flood cost the hospital several million dollars in damages.

In 2016, the U.S. Centers for Medicare & Medicaid Services released the first round of the Overall Hospital Quality Star Rating. Our Lady of Lourdes received one star, and in 2019, received three stars. In 2016, Loudes Hospital also became a certified member of the MD Anderson Cancer Network.

In 2017, Lourdes was granted a three-year/full accreditation designation by the National Accreditation Program for Breast Centers (NAPBC).

In 2018, Lourdes was ranked as the 21st best hospital in New York according to the U.S. News Best Hospitals specialty rankings.

References 

Catholic hospitals in North America
Hospitals in New York (state)
Companies based in Binghamton, New York